Subha may refer to:
 Subah, subdivision of the Moghul Empire territories 
 Subha (writers), the Tamil detective novelists
 Misbaha, Muslim prayer beads, also known as subha